Dial Hot Line is a 1970 American drama made-for-TV film, starring Vince Edwards, Chelsea Brown, Felton Perry, June Harding and Kim Hunter. It originally aired on March 8, 1970 in the ABC Movie of the Week space.

Cast
 Vince Edwards as David Leopold
 Chelsea Brown as Gibson
 Felton Perry as Jimmy
 June Harding as Ann
 Kim Hunter as Mrs. Edith Carruthers
 Lane Bradbury as Pam Carruthers
Michael Larrain as Kevin
Elliott Street as Joe

References

External links

1970 television films
1970 films
ABC Movie of the Week
1970s English-language films
Films directed by Jerry Thorpe